Aurea, golden in Latin, may refer to:

 Aurea (car), a former Italian automobile manufactured in Turin from 1921 to 1930
 Aurea (singer) (born 1987), Portuguese singer
 Aurea Alexandrina, a kind of opiate or antidote
 Áurea, a municipality in the state Rio Grande do Sul, Brazil
 Aurès Mountains, a mountain range in Algeria and Tunisia
 Dioscuri Aurea Saecula, the first demo tape of the Italian National Socialist black metal band Cain
 Domus Aurea (Latin, "Golden House"), a large landscaped portico villa, residence of the Roman emperor Nero
 Ducati Aurea, a motorcycle made from 1958 to 1962
 Legenda Aurea, the Golden Legend, a collection of hagiographies by Jacobus de Voragine
 Legenda Aurea (band), a Swiss heavy metal band
 Lei Áurea, the Golden Law, a law adopted in 1888 that abolished slavery in Brazil
 Ulmus × viminalis 'Aurea', a hybrid cultivar
 Ulmus americana 'Aurea', an American Elm cultivar
 A provider of CRM solutions

See also 
 Aurea (given name)
 Aureus (disambiguation)
 Auratus (disambiguation)
 Saint Aurea (disambiguation)